Cameron Forbes Kerry (born September 6, 1950) is an American attorney who served as general counsel of the U.S. Department of Commerce. He is the younger brother of John Kerry and a member of the Forbes family.

Early life and education
Cameron Forbes Kerry was born in Washington, D.C. He is the fourth child of U.S. diplomat Richard Kerry and Rosemary Forbes of the Forbes family and Dudley–Winthrop family. He graduated from Harvard College in 1972 and Boston College Law School in 1978.

Career
In 1972 he served as strategy director for John Kerry for Congress. In 1973 he was a freelance writer and political consultant. From 1973 to 1974, he was a part time taxi driver for Cambridge Yellow Cab and later campaign director for Paul Guzzi for Secretary of State. 
After graduation from law school, Kerry was an associate with Wilmer Cutler Pickering Hale and Dorr in Washington, D.C. (1979–1982) and served as law clerk to U.S. Senior Circuit Judge Elbert Tuttle (1978–1979), former Chief Judge of the United States Court of Appeals for the Fifth Circuit (now the Eleventh Circuit). He was an Adjunct Professor of Telecommunications Law at Suffolk University Law School and has written on First Amendment and cable television issues from 1997 to 2002. From 1983 to 2009 he was an associate and partner with Mintz, Levin, Cohn, Ferris, Glovsky, and Popeo. In 1976 he was an intern for the Massachusetts Executive Office of Consumer Affairs. He was a summer associate with Ropes & Gray in 1977. In 1982 he served as campaign director for John Kerry for Lieutenant Governor.

In 1983, Cameron Kerry converted from Roman Catholicism to Judaism before marrying Kathy Weinman. His paternal grandparents were Jewish immigrants from Austria who converted to Catholicism.

During brother John's presidential campaign, Cameron Kerry traveled across the country speaking to his brother's views on Israel, campaigning with Harvard Law School professor Alan Dershowitz, writer-comedian Larry David, and Jewish elected officials. During that time Kerry also served as an influential advisor to his brother and played a role in decisions behind the scenes and as a campaign surrogate.

In 2006, Cameron Kerry explored a run for Massachusetts Secretary of the Commonwealth but decided not to run when the Democratic incumbent William F. Galvin announced that he would seek re-election.

During the 2008 presidential campaign, he was the vice chair of the National Jewish Democratic Council and defended Barack Obama in the Jewish press.

On April 20, 2009, President Obama nominated him, and on May 21, 2009, he was confirmed unanimously by the United States Senate as the General Counsel of the Department of Commerce. In this role, Kerry was the principal legal advisor to the Secretary of Commerce and third-ranking secretarial officer. He served as the department's chief legal officer and oversees the work of over 325 lawyers in 14 offices. Kerry also served as the department's chief ethics officer, and co-chaired the secretary's Internet Policy Task Force, which brings together Commerce agencies with expertise on the internet in the 21st-century global economy.

Kerry was appointed acting United States Secretary of Commerce on June 1, 2013, and resumed his position as general counsel on June 26, 2013, when Penny Pritzker was sworn in as the 38th Secretary of Commerce. As the General Counsel of the Department of Commerce, Kerry was the principal legal advisor to the Secretary of Commerce and third-ranking secretarial officer. He resigned his position on September 4, 2013.

From 2014 to 2019 he served as senior counsel with Sidley Austin. Since 2013, he has been a visiting scholar with the Massachusetts Institute of Technology Media Lab and a Tisch distinguished visiting fellow with the Brookings Institution.

Personal life
He and his wife, Kathy Weinman, have two daughters and live in Massachusetts.

References

S. Hrg. 111-418 - NOMINATIONS TO THE DEPARTMENT OF TRANSPORTATION, THE DEPARTMENT OF COMMERCE, AND THE EXECUTIVE OFFICE OF THE PRESIDENT 

1950 births
Living people
Politicians from Boston
Boston College Law School alumni
Harvard College alumni
Forbes family
Kerry family
Massachusetts Democrats
Massachusetts lawyers
Obama administration cabinet members
United States Secretaries of Commerce
20th-century American lawyers
21st-century American lawyers
21st-century American politicians
Winthrop family
Woolsey family
Politicians from Washington, D.C.
Mintz Levin partners
Wilmer Cutler Pickering Hale and Dorr associates